Toifilou Maoulida (born 8 June 1979) is a French former professional footballer who played as a striker or as a winger.

Club career
Maoulida was born in Mayotte, a small island in the Indian Ocean, close to the Comoro Islands and Reunion Island, and raised in Marseille.

He started his professional career at Montpellier Hérault Sport Club in 1997. In January 2002, he was transferred to Stade Rennais F.C. After two seasons, coach László Bölöni considered that Maoulida did not fit in any longer with his tactical scheme and he was loaned to Metz, in the east of France. There, he scored 12 goals in 33 matches. After returning to Stade Rennais for the 2004–05 season he scored 7 goals in 31 matches.

In summer 2005, he was transferred to AS Monaco FC on free transfer, where he failed once more. Eventually, he went to Olympique de Marseille where he finally met success reaching the French Cup final in the 2005–06 and 2006–07 seasons and getting the second place in the French League 1 in the 2006–07 season. He played for AJ Auxerre in the 2007–08 season, and joined RC Lens in January 2008, at that time of the bottom three in Ligue 1.

In August 2011, he signed a contract with Ligue 2 side SC Bastia.

In July 2014, he signed a two-year contract with Ligue 2 team Nîmes Olympique.

International career
Given that Comorians consider the Mayotte's people as their own, the country's football federation asked Maoulida to join the Comorian senior team, but he rejected the offer out of respect for the people of his island.

Career statistics

Honours
Montpellier
UEFA Intertoto Cup: 1999

References

1979 births
Living people
People from Mayotte
French sportspeople of Comorian descent
Mayotte footballers
Comorian footballers
French footballers
Association football wingers
Association football forwards
Montpellier HSC players
Stade Rennais F.C. players
FC Metz players
AS Monaco FC players
Olympique de Marseille players
AJ Auxerre players
RC Lens players
SC Bastia players
Nîmes Olympique players
Tours FC players
Ligue 1 players
Ligue 2 players